Pavel Jirousek (born 3 June 1973) is a retired Czech football midfielder and currently a manager. He made over 200 appearances in the Czech First League. Jirousek played international football at under-21 level for Czech Republic U21.

Honours

Club

 Jablonec
 Czech Cup: 1997–98

References

External links

1973 births
Living people
Czech footballers
Czech Republic under-21 international footballers
Czech football managers
Czech First League players
FK Hvězda Cheb players
FK Jablonec players
SK Dynamo České Budějovice players
Association football midfielders